Melikaiella is a genus of wasps belonging to the family Cynipidae.

The species of this genus are found in Northern America.

Species:

Melikaiella amphibolensis 
Melikaiella bicolor 
Melikaiella ostensackeni 
Melikaiella reticulata

References

Cynipidae
Hymenoptera genera